Gustav Kastropp (30 August 1844 – 11 September 1925) was a German poet, librettist and musician. Kastropp's texts were used by composers such as Georg Schumann, Eugen d'Albert and Bernhard Stavenhagen.

Biography
Kastropp was born in Salmünster, Hesse. He went to Gymnasium in Göttingen and just like his father he worked as a pharmacist. He studied music at the conservatories in Stuttgart, Göttingen and Sondershausen. From 1874 to 1877 he taught literature at the Großherzogliche Orchesterschule in Weimar.

He died in Hildesheim, Germany.

Works
 König Elfs Lieder (1875)
 Helene (1875)
 Suleika (1876)
 Gnomenmärchen (1877)
 Dornröschen (1877)
 Das vierblättrige Kleebatt (1879), with Richard Roltsch
 Kain (1880)
 Heinrich von Ofterdingen (1880)
 Agamemnon (1890)
 Gunhild (1891)
 Phantasien und Märchen (1891)
 Gernot (1896), libretto for an opera by Eugen d'Albert
 Der Improvisator (1902), libretto for an opera by Eugen d'Albert

References

External links
 Poets and librettists

1844 births
1925 deaths
German male poets
German poets
State University of Music and Performing Arts Stuttgart alumni